Artitropa cama is a species of butterfly in the family Hesperiidae. It is found in Cameroon, the Republic of the Congo and Zambia.

The larvae feed on Dracaena species.

References

Butterflies described in 1937
Hesperiinae